Abu Dhabi Airports was established in 4 March 2006 and offers aviation-related services at Abu Dhabi's airports. The airports it is responsible for include Abu Dhabi International Airport, Al Ain International Airport, Al Bateen Executive Airport, Dalma Airport and Sir Bani Yas Airport.

References

External links
adairports.ae

Aviation in the United Arab Emirates
Airport operators
2006 establishments in the United Arab Emirates
Transport in the Emirate of Abu Dhabi